The Ministry of Agriculture and Land Reclamation of Egypt is a ministerial body in charge of agriculture and land reclamation in Egypt.

History
The Ministry of Agriculture was established on 20 November 1913. In 1996, it was renamed Ministry of Agriculture and Land Reclamation. One of its goals is to address sustainability in agriculture such as better ways to do agricultural irrigation.

In 2016, an agency from Switzerland was put in charge of inspecting Egypt's imported wheat. Egypt imports the most wheat of any country and around 40% of the average Egyptians' income is spent on food.

Farmland
As of 2000, small farms (between 5 and 6 feddans) accounted for most (49.61%) of the agricultural land ownership in Egypt. 34.72% of farm holdings were of 1 feddan or less. The hope is that with desalination plants, new wells and better infrastructure farmers will be able to grow more wheat.

In April 2018 Egypt purchased wheat from local farmers but not at a price farmers found sustainable.

Land reclamation
A land reclamation project began in 2015, near the town of Farafra. Large government and private investment and initiatives in farming the Sahara Desert have sometimes ended with little to show.

In June 2017, it was announced 1.7 million feddans had been reclaimed and according to the Egyptian Prime Minister, Sherif Ismail, this work would continue. It was President Abdel Fattah el-Sisi who, in May 2017, asked for the armed services to begin reclaiming land by demolishing illegally erected structures on land not owned by builders or squatters.

Ministers
 Ayman Farid Abu-Hadid - from July 2013
 Adel Tawfik al-Sayed al-Beltagy
 Mahmoud Salah Eddin Hilal
 Essam Fayed - from September 2015
  Abdul Moneim El-Banna - from February 2017
El-Said Marzouq El-Qosair - from December 2019

See also

 Cabinet of Egypt
List of Ministers of Agriculture and Land Reclamation of Egypt
Egyptian land reform
New Valley Project

References

External links
Ministry of Agriculture and Land Reclamation Official website
 Egyptian International Center of the Agriculture (EICA)
 Ministry of Agricultural Foreign Agricultural Relations 
 International Center for Agricultural Research in the Dry Areas
 Ministry of Agricultural and Land Reclamation on Facebook
 Egypt's Cabinet Database

1913 establishments in Egypt
Ministries established in 1913
Egypt
Egypt
Agriculture
Agricultural organisations based in Egypt